Aspergillus bertholletius is a species of fungus in the genus Aspergillus. It is from the Flavi section. The species was first described in 2012. It has been isolated from Brazil nuts (Bertholletia excelsa).

Growth and morphology
A. bertholletius has been cultivated on both Czapek yeast extract agar (CYA) plates and Malt Extract Agar Oxoid® (MEAOX) plates. The growth morphology of the colonies can be seen in the pictures below.

References

bertholletius
Fungi described in 2012